The year 1853 in science and technology involved some significant events, listed below.

Biology
 March 17 – Claude Bernard presents his doctoral thesis describing the glycogenetic function of the liver.
 Anton de Bary publishes the first study demonstrating that rust and smut fungi cause plant disease.

Exploration
 November 25 – First definite sighting of Heard Island in the Antarctic. 
 Alfred Russel Wallace publishes A Narrative of Travels on the Amazon and Rio Negro, with an account of the native tribes, and observations on the climate, geology, and natural history of the Amazon Valley.

Mathematics
 Jakob Steiner investigates the Steiner system.

Medicine
 August 1 – Under terms of the Vaccination Act in the United Kingdom, all children born after this date are to receive compulsory vaccination against smallpox during their first 3 months of life.
 William Little publishes a paper "On the Deformities of the Human Frame" in which he gives the first description of pseudo-hypertrophic muscular dystrophy.
 Charles Pravaz and Alexander Wood independently invent a practical hypodermic syringe.
 Antoine Desormeaux produces and names an endoscope illuminated by a kerosene lamp, using it to examine the urinary tract.

Meteorology
 John Francis Campbell invents the original form of Campbell–Stokes recorder (for sunshine).

Technology
 Eugenio Barsanti and Felice Matteucci first develop the Barsanti-Matteucci engine, an internal combustion engine using the free-piston principle.
 Sir George Cayley built and demonstrated the first heavier-than-air aircraft (a glider).

Awards
 Copley Medal: Heinrich Wilhelm Dove
 Wollaston Medal for Geology: Adolphe d'Archiac; Édouard de Verneuil

Births
 January 24 – Alfred Senier (died 1918), British chemist.
 February 15 – Frederick Treves (died 1923), English surgeon.
 March 2 – Ambrosius Hubrecht (died 1915), Dutch zoologist.
 March 10 – William Hampton Patton (died 1918), American entomologist.
 April 8 – Laura Alberta Linton (died 1915), American chemist.
 July 18 – Hendrik Lorentz (died 1928), Dutch physicist and Nobel laureate.
 September 2 – Wilhelm Ostwald (died 1932), Baltic German chemist.
 September 9 – Pierre Marie (died 1940), French neurologist.

Deaths
 March 17 – Christian Doppler (born 1803), Austrian mathematician and discoverer of the Doppler effect.
 March 20 – Robert James Graves (born 1796), Irish physician
 April 23 – Auguste Laurent (born 1807), French chemist.
 July 8 – Ernst Friedrich Germar (born 1786), German entomologist.
 September 14 – Hugh Edwin Strickland (born 1811), English geologist and ornithologist.
 October 2 – François Arago (born 1786), French mathematician, physicist, and astronomer.
 October 18 – Gotthelf Fischer von Waldheim (born 1771), German naturalist.

References

 
19th century in science
1850s in science